Tol Siah (also Romanized as Tol Sīāh, Tall-e Sīāh, Tol-e Sīāh, and Tol Seyāh) is a village in Howmeh Rural District, in the Central District of Bushehr County, Bushehr Province, Iran. At the 2006 census, its population was 527, in 133 families.

References 

Populated places in Bushehr County